Krasnoye is a rural locality (a selo) and the administrative center of Krasnenskoye Rural Settlement, Alexeyevsky District, Belgorod Oblast, Russia. The population was 904 as of 2010. There are 5 streets.

References 

Rural localities in Alexeyevsky District, Belgorod Oblast
Biryuchensky Uyezd